The deputy chief minister of the Northern Territory is a role in the Government of the Northern Territory assigned to a responsible Minister in the Northern Territory. It has second ranking behind the chief minister of the Northern Territory in Cabinet, and its holder serves as acting chief minister during absence or incapacity of the chief minister.  The deputy chief minister is almost always the deputy leader of the governing party.

The incumbent deputy chief minister of the Northern Territory is Nicole Manison. Manison assumed the position in September 2016 becoming the first deputy chief minister of the current Labor Government since August 2016.

List of deputy chief ministers of the Northern Territory

References

 Legislative Assembly of the Northern Territory 1974 – 2012 Office Holders

See also
 List of chief ministers of the Northern Territory by time in office

Northern
Deputy